Loring Milton Black Jr. (May 17, 1886  – May 21, 1956) was an American lawyer and politician who served six terms as  a United States representative from New York from 1923 to 1935.

Biography
Loring was born in New York City on May 17, 1886, a son of Loring M. Black and Elizabeth Black. He attended the public schools of New York City and was a 1903 graduate of Fordham Preparatory School. In 1907, he graduated from Fordham University with a Bachelor of Arts degree. He attended Columbia Law School from 1907 to 1909, was admitted to the bar in 1909, and practiced in New York City.

Black was a member of the New York State Senate (4th D.) in 1911 and 1912. Due to his young age he became known as the "Kid Senator". He was again a member of the State Senate in 1919 and 1920.

Black was elected as a Democrat to the 68th, 69th, 70th, 71st, 72nd and 73rd United States Congresses, holding office from March 4, 1923 to January 3, 1935. Opposing prohibition, he was one of the leaders of the "wet bloc" in Congress. Black served as chairman of the Committee on Claims in the 72nd and 73rd Congresses.

After leaving Congress, Black resumed the practice of law in New York City and Washington, D.C. He died of a heart attack on May 21, 1956, while shopping in a Washington, D.C. drugstore. He was buried at Fort Lincoln Cemetery in Brentwood, Maryland.

Family
In 1913, Black married Beatrice Marie Eddy. Their children included Loring M., Elizabeth V., Jeanne, and John E. The Blacks later divorced, and Loring Black's second wife was Laura Spencer.

References

External links 

1886 births
1956 deaths
Fordham University alumni
Columbia Law School alumni
Democratic Party New York (state) state senators
Democratic Party members of the United States House of Representatives from New York (state)
20th-century American politicians
Fordham Preparatory School alumni